The Navy Office was a higher command within the German Navy, founded in 1965 and disestablished in 2012. Its original responsibility was training, education and armaments planning for the German Navy. It was situated at Wilhelmshaven until it was relocated to Rostock after German reunification in 1990. In 2001 it was merged with the former Navy Support Command, expanding its responsibilities to include naval logistics. 

The Marineamt was commanded by a Rear Admiral directly subordinate to the Chief of the Naval Staff in the Ministry of Defence. It was the superior command for all naval schools and bases as well as of some research and development institutions.

In 2012, the Marineamt was combined with the Naval Staff in the Ministry of Defence in Bonn and Fleet Command in Glücksburg to form Navy Command (Marinekommando), located in Rostock.

See also
 List of naval ships of Germany

References

German Navy
1965 establishments in West Germany
2012 disestablishments in Germany